The strawweight division in mixed martial arts is for competitors weighing between 106 and 115 lb (48 to 52 kg). It sits between the lighter atomweight division and the heavier flyweight division.
 The UFC's strawweight division, which groups competitors within 106 to 115 lb (48 to 52 kg)
 The ONE Championship's strawweight division, with upper limit at 
 The Road FC's strawweight division, with upper limit at 115 lb (52 kg)

Ambiguity and clarification 
Until recently, the strawweight division in mixed martial arts was not defined by the Unified Rules of Mixed Martial Arts, which since the inception of the Unified Rules had grouped all competitors below 125 lb (57 kg) together as flyweights. Support for the class has grown steadily since about 2013:

 Invicta Fighting Championships, an all women's MMA organization, held their first strawweight title fight on January 5, 2013, and now regularly holds contests at this weight and circulates a championship title. 
Super Fight League, an Indian MMA promotion, have been holding female strawweight fights at 105-115 pounds / 52.2 kilograms since SFL 17 in May 2013.
 In Japan, Shooto regularly holds contests at that weight class and circulates a championship belt for the division.
 UFC has added a women's strawweight division that is set at 115 lbs.
 Carla Esparza became the inaugural UFC Women's Strawweight Champion at The Ultimate Fighter: A Champion Will Be Crowned Finale on December 12, 2014.
 The Association of Boxing Commissions officially added the 115 lb strawweight division on July 29, 2015.

Professional champions

Current champions
These tables were last updated in March 2023.

Men:

Women:

See also
List of current MMA Strawweight Champions
List of current MMA Women's Strawweight Champions
Mixed martial arts weight classes

References

Mixed martial arts weight classes